R (Equal Opportunities Commission) v Birmingham City Council [1989] AC 1155 is a discrimination case, relevant for UK labour law case, concerning the appropriate comparisons that should be made.

Facts
Birmingham only provided 360 grammar school places for girls, and 540 for boys. At first instance, the EOC won. The Court of Appeal upheld this. The Council appealed, arguing it had not shown that selective education was better than non-selective education as a precondition to showing less favourable treatment, and in any case the Council had no intention or motivation to discriminate.

Judgment
Lord Goff dismissed the council’s appeal, saying first that it did not need to be shown that selective education was ‘better’, just that girls were not being given the same opportunities. Second, it is enough that there is less favourable treatment and the ‘intention or motive of the defendant to discriminate, though it may be relevant so far as remedies are concerned… is not a necessary condition to liability.’ That would be a bad idea because then ‘it would be a good defence for an employer to show that he discriminated against women not because he intended to do so but (for example) because of customer preference, or to save money, or even to avoid controversy.’

See also

UK labour law
EU labour law

Notes

References

United Kingdom labour case law
House of Lords cases
1989 in case law
1989 in British law
Birmingham City Council
1980s in Birmingham, West Midlands